Gabriel Ruiz Galindo (March 18, 1908 in Guadalajara, JaliscoJanuary 31, 1999) was a Mexican songwriter. He was son of Rosalío Ruiz and Aurelia Galindo.

Songs
 Amor (1943 song)

Film music
 1952 Delirio tropical.
 1945 La sombra de Chucho el Roto.
 1943 Tentación.
 1940 Man or Devil.

References

1908 births
Musicians from Guadalajara, Jalisco
Mexican songwriters
Male songwriters
Mexican pianists
1999 deaths
20th-century pianists
Male pianists
20th-century male musicians